Janki may refer to the following places:
Janki means Devi Sita in India (also known as Janaki)
Janki, Gmina Horodło in Lublin Voivodeship (east Poland)
Janki, Gmina Hrubieszów in Lublin Voivodeship (east Poland)
Janki, Podlaskie Voivodeship (north-east Poland)
Janki, Łódź Voivodeship (central Poland)
Janki, Gostynin County in Masovian Voivodeship (east-central Poland)
Janki, Grójec County in Masovian Voivodeship (east-central Poland)
Janki, Pruszków County in Masovian Voivodeship (east-central Poland)
Janki, Radom County in Masovian Voivodeship (east-central Poland)
Janki, Wyszków County in Masovian Voivodeship (east-central Poland)

See also 
Janki Młode,  Ostrołęka County in Masovian Voivodeship (east-central Poland)
Janki, Warmian-Masurian Voivodeship (north Poland)